Russell Snowberger (October 8, 1901 – September 28, 1968) was an American racecar driver and owner active from the 1920s through the 1950s. After his lengthy Indianapolis career, Snowberger continued his affiliation with the "500" by sponsoring entries throughout the 1950s.

Early life
He was born on October 8, 1901 in Denton, Maryland.

Career
Snowberger drove his first race in 1921 at the fairgrounds at Harrington, Delaware. By the middle 1920s Russ was becoming a consistent winner including the first 100 miler run at Langhorne, Pennsylvania. Russ won the national motor racing association championship in 1926. He was a                     
fierce competitor on the board superspeedways as well as the dirt tracks.

In 1927 he joined American Automobile Association and was in the starting lineup at 1928 Indianapolis 500. Snowberger's car was the first one to drop out with mechanical problems but Russ drove relief for Jimmy Gleason and led the race for eleven laps. Ironically the winning car was prepared by Russ for him to drive in the race however the owner had to sell it shortly before the
race needing the money. In November of that same year Russ was one of the Studebaker team drivers to run 24 hours non stop at the Atlantic City
board track.

With the Great Depression came rule changes by AAA to keep auto racing alive. Now allowing stock block engines, men like Russ with small budgets could
compete. In 1930 Russ finished 2nd in five of the seven champ car races that season. In the other two races he blew a head gasket at Altoona and 
finished 8th in the Indy 500. He most likely would have done better if not for a 17 minute pit stop for a broken shock tower repair. With a total
investment of fourteen hundred dollars he finished 4th in the AAA championship. For the entire season he spent a dollar and a quarter for gasket
material and ended up winning over $10,000. in prize money. More than most bank presidents showed for the year.
For 1931 Russ won the coveted pole position at Indianapolis with the same car and Studebaker engine. A record lasting 54 years until 1985. With some
tire problems during the race he still managed to finish in 5th place. Again in 1932 he finished 5th and 8th the following years. He became known      
as the King of the Stock Blocks.
In 1935 he was a charter member of the famed Champion 100 Mile An hour Club.

Snowberger secured a ride in one of Mike Boyle's Miller Specials in 1935, but dropped out of Indy. Next it was Joel Thorne, heir to a vast fortune, who beckoned to Russ to pilot one of his cars. He did not make the race however as he hit the wall during practice and was injured. It was in 1937 that Russ and Thorne separated with Snowberger building a new car with a Packard straight eight in it. On lap 66 he retired with a slipping clutch. Snowberger also ran in the Vanderbilt Cup Race in 1936 and 1937 finishing eighth in 1937 along with seventh place at Pikes Peak Hill Climb. He also prepared six winning cars for the Pikes Peak Hill Climb driven by Louis Unser between 1938 and 1955. It was in 1938 that Russ put his Indy car in the middle of the front row between Floyd Roberts and Rex Mays. Another year he had the win in his sights until a rod broke putting him out

During World War II Russ worked at Packard, where he was in charge of all dyno testing of the Rolls-Royce engines for the P-51 Mustangs. Capt. Eddie Rickenbacker was instrumental in putting Russ in this position.

Russ ran again at Indy in 1946 and 1947 but dropped out both years with mechanical problems. In 1951 Russ Snowberger ran his last race, which was the Pikes Peak Hill Climb. After retiring as an active driver he spent the rest of his career as chief mechanic on the Federal Engineering team out of Detroit, Michigan from 1947 until he prepared his last Indy car for 1961. From 1962 until his death Russ ran a production machine company.

Later life and death
He died on September 28, 1968 in Mount Clemens, Michigan, and is buried in Clinton Grove Cemetery in Clinton Township, Macomb County, Michigan.

Indy 500 results

As a driver

As a constructor

Legacy
Inducted into the Michigan Motor Sports Hall of Fame in 1985.
Inducted into the Delaware Sports Museum and Hall of Fame in 1988.

References

External links
 

1901 births
1968 deaths
People from Denton, Maryland
Racing drivers from Maryland
Indianapolis 500 drivers
Indianapolis 500 polesitters
AAA Championship Car drivers